The 2004 Vuelta a Castilla y León was the 19th edition of the Vuelta a Castilla y León cycle race and was held on 28 April to 2 May 2004. The race started in Belorado and finished in Villafranca del Bierzo. The race was won by Koldo Gil.

Teams
Thirteen teams of up to eight riders started the race:

 
 
 
 
 
 
 
 
 
 
 
 Cafés Baqué
 Spanish national team

General classification

References

Vuelta a Castilla y León
Vuelta a Castilla y León by year
2004 in Spanish sport